Zherizhah (also Romanized as Zherīzhah and Zherīzheh; also known as Zhelīzheh) is a village in Zherizhah Rural District, in the Central District of Sarvabad County, Kurdistan Province, Iran. At the 2006 census, its population was 510, in 134 families. The village is populated by Kurds.

References 

Towns and villages in Sarvabad County
Kurdish settlements in Kurdistan Province